Snap general elections were held in Vanuatu on 13 October 2022 to elect all 52 seats in Parliament. President Nikenike Vurobaravu dissolved Parliament in August 2022 on advice of the Council of Ministers ahead of a no-confidence vote against Prime Minister Bob Loughman.

Background
On 18 August 2022 the new president dissolved Parliament midway through the parliamentary term at the request of Prime Minister Bob Loughman, who requested the dissolution to avoid a no confidence vote. The motion sparked criticism from the opposition, with opposition leader Ralph Regenvanu announcing that the opposing parties would contest the dissolution in court.

Electoral system
The 52 members of Parliament were elected for four years terms by single non-transferable vote in eighteen constituencies, ten of which were multi-member constituencies of between two and seven seats, while the remaining eight were single-member constituencies in which the vote takes the form of a first-past-the-post system.

Results

Aftermath
On 4 November Ishmael Kalsakau of the UMP, who has been the Deputy Prime Minister in the previous government, has been approved as Prime Minister after siding with the previous Leader of Opposition, Ralph Regenvanu of the GJP. The parliamentary majority in support of Kalsaku is composed of members from 8 coalition partners: UMP, GJP, LPV, RMC, NUP, VNDP, PPP and LM, for a total of 30 MPs. Vanuatu elected its first woman parliament member in 14 years; Gloria Julia King.

See also
List of elections in 2022
List of political parties in Vanuatu

References

Vanuatu
General
Elections in Vanuatu
Vanuatu